Thyrsanthera is a genus of plants in the Euphorbiaceae first described as a genus in 1925. It contains only one known species, Thyrsanthera suborbicularis, native to Thailand, Cambodia, Vietnam, and possibly Laos.

References

Chrozophoreae
Monotypic Euphorbiaceae genera
Flora of Indo-China